Egas Gomes de Sousa (1035 -?) was a Portuguese noble  of County of Portugal and the first of his line to use the surname Sousa. He was Lord of the House of Sousa and of Felgueiras.

Biography 
He served as governor of the entire region of Entre Douro e Minho. He was captain-general, and as such in combat he beat the King of Tunis in a battle near the town of Beja. He was buried in the Monastery of Pombeiro.

Family 
He was the son of  Gomes Echigues and his 1st wife, Gontronde Moniz de Touro, daughter of Munio Moniz de Bierzo, Count of Bierzo and Muniadona Moniz. He married a member of the Maia family, although there are various versions as to her name and filiation.

 Mem Viegas de Sousa, married Teresa Fernandes de Marnel;
 Gomes Viegas

References

Bibliography 

 
 

Portuguese Roman Catholics
People of the Reconquista
1035 births
11th-century Roman Catholics
County of Portugal
11th-century Portuguese people
Year of death missing